Wiris Gustavo de Oliveira (born 4 July 2000), commonly known as Wiris, is a Brazilian footballer who plays as a midfielder for Fluminense.

Career statistics

Club

Notes

Honours

Club
Lokomotiv Plovdiv
 Bulgarian Cup: 2018–19

References

2000 births
Living people
Brazilian footballers
Brazilian expatriate footballers
Association football midfielders
Campo Grande Atlético Clube players
PFC Lokomotiv Plovdiv players
First Professional Football League (Bulgaria) players
Brazilian expatriate sportspeople in Bulgaria
Expatriate footballers in Bulgaria